Eva Reign is an American actress, journalist, and writer. She is best known for lead role in the 2022 Amazon Prime Video American coming-of-age romantic comedy film Anything's Possible. Reign has written for Vogue, New York, Them, Highsnobiety, and PAPER. She is a recipeint of a Peabody Award and a GLAAD Media Award for her work as a correspondent in the Vice News documentary series Transnational.

Biography 
Reign is from St. Louis, Missouri. Growing up, she performed in school plays and community theatre productions.

In 2019, she starred in Tourmaline's short film Salacia, about the transgender woman Mary Jones. The film is now part of the Museum of Modern Art's permanent collection. In 2021, Reign was mentored by Tourmaline through the Queer|Art|Mentorship program.

Reign made her film debut as Kelsa in Ximena García Lecuona's and Billy Porter's 2022 American coming-of-age romantic comedy film Anything's Possible, which premiered on Amazon Prime Video in July 2022. She accompanied Porter to the 75th Tony Awards in June 2022.

She won a Peabody Award and a GLAAD Media Award for her work as a correspondent in the Vice News documentary series Transnational, which explored the experiences of transgender people and trans communities throughout the world. Reign hosted the series premiere episode, Love Us in the Light, which focused on the life of Kelly Stough, a trans woman from Detroit, who is a member of the House of Ebony ballroom family.

She has written for Vogue, New York, Them, Highsnobiety, and PAPER.

Filmography 
 Salacia, 2019
 Sideways Smile (TV Series) as Jessie, 2020
 Anything's Possible as Kelsa, 2022

References

External links 
 

Living people
Year of birth missing (living people)
Date of birth missing (living people)
21st-century African-American women
21st-century LGBT people
African-American actresses
Actresses from St. Louis
American film actresses
American reporters and correspondents
GLAAD Media Awards winners
LGBT African Americans
American LGBT actors
American LGBT journalists
LGBT media personalities
LGBT people from Missouri
Peabody Award winners
Transgender actresses
Transgender writers